François-Léonard Dupont, called Dupont-Watteau (1756–1824) a French painter, miniaturist, and pastellist was born at Moorsel in 1756, and studied at Lille under Louis Watteau, whose daughter he married in 1782. In 1798 he gave up art for mechanics, with the study of which he had begun life. He died at Lille in 1824. During the years devoted to art, Dupont painted in all mediums and all subjects — portraits, genre subjects, &c. In the Lille Museum is a picture by him, dated 1785, of the 'Attributes of the Fine Arts,' and in the Glasgow Corporation Galleries is 'The Vintage.'

References

Attribution:
 

1756 births
1824 deaths
18th-century Flemish painters
18th-century French painters
French male painters
19th-century French painters
People from Aalst, Belgium
Artists from Lille
19th-century French male artists
18th-century French male artists